The Women's 50 metre backstroke swimming events for the 2020 Summer Paralympics took place at the Tokyo Aquatics Centre from August 29 to September 3, 2021. A total of four events were contested over this distance.

Schedule

Medal summary
The following is a summary of the medals awarded across all 50 metre backstroke events.

Results
The following were the results of the finals only of each of the Women's 50 metre backstroke events in each of the classifications. Further details of each event, including where appropriate heats and semi finals results, are available on that event's dedicated page.

S2

The S2 category is for swimmers who may have limited function in their hands, trunk, and legs, and mainly rely on their arms to swim.

The final in this classification took place on 2 September 2021:

S3

The S3 category is for swimmers who have leg or arm amputations, have severe coordination problems in their limbs, or have to swim with their arms but don't use their trunk or legs.

The final in this classification took place on 29 August 2021:

S4

The S4 category is for swimmers who have function in their hands and arms but can't use their trunk or legs to swim, or they have three amputated limbs.

The final in this classification took place on 3 September 2021:

S5

The S5 category is for swimmers who have hemiplegia, paraplegia or short stature.

The final in this classification took place on 30 August 2021:

References

Swimming at the 2020 Summer Paralympics
2021 in women's swimming